Pierre de Broc (7 June 1601–7 July 1671) was Bishop of Auxerre from 1640 to 1671.

See also

 Roman Catholic Diocese of Auxerre

Bishops of Auxerre
1601 births
1671 births
Place of birth missing
Place of death missing